Haibei Tibetan Autonomous Prefecture (Tib.pin.: cojang poirig ranggyong kü) is an autonomous prefecture of northeastern Qinghai Province, China. Its name literally means "north of Qinghai Lake." This Tibetan culture area was incorporated into Qinghai province into Qinghai province in the early 1950s, as opposed to being part of the Tibet Autonomous Region.

Demographics
According to the 2000 census, Haibei has 258,922 inhabitants with a population density of 6.58 inhabitants/km2.

The following is a list of ethnic groups in the prefecture, 2000 census.

Subdivisions
The prefecture is subdivided into 4 county-level divisions: 3 counties and 1 autonomous county:

References

External links

 
Tibetan autonomous prefectures
Tibetan people
Amdo
Prefecture-level divisions of Qinghai